Buck Creek is a stream in Butler County in the U.S. state of Missouri. It is a tributary of the Black River.

Buck Creek probably was named for the bucks in the area.

See also
List of rivers of Missouri

References

Rivers of Butler County, Missouri
Rivers of Missouri